Johan Kling (born Carl-David Johan Natt och Dag, 7 August 1962, in Stockholm, Sweden) is a Swedish film director, screenwriter, and novelist. His debut movie, Darling (2007), won the award for best Swedish film.

Career
Kling started his career making in music and television and directing TV shows.

Movies

Darling
Kling's debut feature, Darling, which he wrote and directed, was released in 2007. The movie is based on a short film, Jag, made a few years earlier. Darling is "a dark comedy about morals and manners in Stockholm," and stars Michael Segerström and Michelle Meadows. The latter's performance was praised highly by Variety, which also praised Kling's "smooth" direction.

After winning the Best Film award, the "Nordic Film Prize," at the 2007 Gothenburg Film Festival, Darling garnered almost every possible award in Sweden. At the Swedish Film Awards in 2007, the Guldbagge Awards, Darling was nominated in six categories and won the awards for Best Male Actor and Best Cinematography. The film was awarded the award for best film of 2007 by the Swedish Association of Film Critics.

Darling had its international premiere at the San Sebastián International Film Festival in Spain, where it competed in the New Directors section.

Darling was awarded Best Movie prize at the 2008 Baltic Debuts film festival in Svetlogorsk, Russia. In 2011 Johan Kling is returning to Baltic Debuts as the member of the international jury.

Trust Me
Kling announced in 2008 that Darling would be followed by Trust Me, again starring Michelle Meadows and Michael Segerström.

Novels
Kling's novel Människor helt utan betydelse was published in 2009, and tells the story of a PR worker and his girlfriend; the leading Swedish newspaper Svenska Dagbladet thought it one of the more notable Swedish books of the year.

Filmography
Darling (2007)
Trust Me (2010)

Bibliography

References

External links

Living people
1962 births
Swedish film directors
21st-century Swedish novelists
Writers from Stockholm
Swedish male novelists